In 1892, the Barber design was used for the 10¢, 25¢, and 50¢ coins.
 In 1909, both the Indian Head and Lincoln designs were used for the 1¢ coins.
 In 1913, both the Liberty Head and Buffalo designs were used for 5¢ coins.
 In 1916, both the Mercury and Barber designs were used for the 10¢ coins.
 In 1916, both the Standing Liberty and Barber designs were used for the 25¢ coins.
 In 1921, both the Peace and Morgan designs were used for the $1 coins.
 In 1932, the Washington design was used for 25¢ coins.
 In 1938, both the Buffalo and Jefferson designs were used for 5¢ coins.
 In 1942, both the copper-nickel and 35% silver planchets were used for 5¢ coins.
 In 1946, the Roosevelt design was used for 10¢ coins.
 In 1948, the Franklin design was used for 50¢ coins.
 In 1964 all $1 coins minted that year are supposed to have been melted at the mint, and the Kennedy design was used for the 50¢ coins.
 In 1971, the Eisenhower design was used for $1 coins.
 In 1975 and 1976 all 25¢, 50¢, and $1 coins were dated 1776-1976.
 In 1979, the Susan B. Anthony design was used for $1 coins.
 In 1982, both the bronze and copper-plated zinc planchets were used for 1¢ coins.
 In 2000, the Sacagawea dollar was used for $1 coins.

See also
 Numismatics
 Mint (coin)
 List of mints

Notes

External links
  United States Mint - Circulating Coins Production data.
 R.S. Yeoman, A Guide Book of United States Coins.  Mintages are given for each denomination back to 1793 by date and mint.
 United States Mint website: ,  dead links
 COINSHEET Nurismatic Directory website:  (This site uses US Mint which has since been removed from the Mint's site.)
  also uses old Mint data.  Dead Link

Coin production